Stanislav Sergeyevich Buchnev (born 17 July 1990) is a professional football player who plays as a goalkeeper for Pyunik. Born in Russia, he plays for the Armenia national football team.

Club career
Buchnev made his Russian Football National League debut for FC Angusht Nazran on 2 August 2013 in a game against FC Salyut Belgorod.

On 29 July 2020, Buchnev signed for Armenian Premier League club FC Pyunik.

International career
Born in Russia and of Armenian descent, Buchnev was called up to represent the Armenia national team for 2022 FIFA World Cup qualification matches in September 2021. He made a debut for the national team on 14 November 2021 in a 1–4 loss against Germany.

Honours
Pyunik
 Armenian Premier League: 2021–22

References

External links
 
 

1990 births
Sportspeople from Vladikavkaz
Living people
Armenian footballers
Armenia international footballers
Russian footballers
Russian sportspeople of Armenian descent
Association football goalkeepers
FC Angusht Nazran players
FC Volgar Astrakhan players
FC Tyumen players
FC Neftekhimik Nizhnekamsk players
FC Fakel Voronezh players
FC Pyunik players
Russian First League players
Russian Second League players
Armenian Premier League players
Russian expatriate footballers
Expatriate footballers in Armenia
FC Mashuk-KMV Pyatigorsk players